James Dewar (12 October 1942 – 16 May 2002) was a Scottish musician best known as the bassist and vocalist for Robin Trower and Stone the Crows, the latter having its beginnings as the resident band at Burns Howff in Glasgow.

Biography
Dewar's career began with Lulu and the Luvvers in the early 1960s. His career eventually reached its zenith with the Robin Trower Band, a British rock power trio, after the 1974 release of the album Bridge of Sighs.

Dewar made his mark as an acclaimed blue-eyed soul singer, performing in front of sold-out stadiums and concert halls at the crest of the 1970s classic rock era. The Scot had a rich, powerful voice, with a soulful timbre, and has been regarded by critics as one of the most under-rated rock vocalists. His vocal sound was deep, gritty, and resonating, his style shows the influence of Ray Charles and Otis Redding.  Like Paul Rodgers and Frankie Miller, his voice evoked a bluesy, soul-inspired sound.
 
Dewar recorded his one solo album, Stumbledown Romancer, during the 1970s, at the height of his career, but it was not released until two decades later.  He collaborated primarily with former Procol Harum organist Matthew Fisher on the album, with the title track relating a hard-luck story.

At Dykebar Hospital in Paisley, Scotland, Dewar died in May 2002 of a stroke after years of disability resulting from a rare medical condition, CADASIL, which caused a series of strokes. His funeral was held at Paisley's Woodside Crematorium.

Discography

With Stone the Crows

on bass:
Stone the Crows (1970)
Ode to John Law (1970)

With Robin Trower Band
as lead singer and bassist (except where noted):
 1973  Twice Removed from Yesterday
 1974  Bridge of Sighs
 1975  For Earth Below
 1976  Robin Trower Live!
 1976  Long Misty Days
 1977  In City Dreams (lead singer only)
 1978  Caravan to Midnight (lead singer only)
 1979  Victims of the Fury
 1983  Back It Up

Solo
 1998 Stumbledown Romancer
 2015 Word for Word CD single

References

External links
 TrowerPower.com – Official Robin Trower website

1942 births
2002 deaths
Musicians from Glasgow
Scottish baritones
Scottish bass guitarists
20th-century Scottish male singers
Scottish rock singers
20th-century Scottish musicians
20th-century bass guitarists
Male bass guitarists